The 2006 BWF Super Series was the twenty-fourth, and the last edition of the IBF World Grand Prix of badminton. It was replaced by the BWF Super Series & BWF Grand Prix Gold and Grand Prix for the 2007 season.

Results 
Below is the schedule released by International Badminton Federation:

Key

Winners

Finals

January

March

May

June

July

August

October

November

December

Statistics

Performance by countries 
Below are the 2006 IBF World Grand Prix performances by countries. Only countries who have won a title are listed:

Performance by categories

Men's singles

Women's singles

Men's doubles

Women's doubles

Mixed doubles

References 

2006
Badminton tournaments
2006 in badminton